Slovenia participated at the 2018 Summer Youth Olympics in Buenos Aires, Argentina from 6 October to 18 October 2018.

Medalists

Medals awarded to participants of mixed-NOC teams are represented in italics. These medals are not counted towards the individual NOC medal tally.

|width="30%" align=left valign=top|

Competitors

Athletics

Boys

Girls

Badminton

Slovenia qualified one player based on the Badminton Junior World Rankings. 

Singles

Team

Basketball

Slovenia qualified a boys' team based on the U18 3x3 National Federation Ranking.

 Boys' tournament - 1 team of 4 athletes

Boys' tournament

Dunk contest

Canoeing

Slovenia qualified one boat based on its performance at the 2018 World Qualification Event.

 Boys' K1 - 1 boat

Boys

Cycling

Slovenia qualified a boys' combined team based on its ranking in the Youth Olympic Games Junior Nation Rankings.

 Boys' combined team - 1 team of 2 athletes

Judo

Individual

Team

Rowing

Slovenia qualified one boat based on its performance at the 2018 European Rowing Junior Championships.

 Girls' single sculls - 1 boat

Sailing

Slovenia qualified one boat based on its performance at the African and European IKA Twin Tip Racing Qualifiers.

 Boys' IKA Twin Tip Racing - 1 boat
Boys

Shooting

Individual

Team

Sport climbing

Slovenia qualified two sport climbers based on its performance at the 2017 World Youth Sport Climbing Championships.

 Girls' combined - 2 quotas (Lučka Rakovec, Vita Lukan)

Swimming

Boys

Girls

Table Tennis

Taekwondo

Tennis

Singles

Doubles

Triathlon

Slovenia qualified one athlete based on its performance at the 2018 European Youth Olympic Games Qualifier.

Individual

Relay

References

2018 in Slovenian sport
Nations at the 2018 Summer Youth Olympics
Slovenia at the Youth Olympics